The 2017–18 CEV Women's Challenge Cup was the 38th edition of the European Challenge Cup volleyball club tournament, the former "CEV Cup".

Format
The tournament is played on a knockout format, with 37 teams participating. Initially 10 teams play a qualification round with the 5 winners advancing to the main phase. On 14 June 2017, a drawing of lots in Luxembourg City, Luxembourg, determined the team's pairing for each match. Each team plays a home and an away match with result points awarded for each leg (3 points for 3–0 or 3–1 wins, 2 points for 3–2 win, 1 point for 2–3 loss). After two legs, the team with the most result points advances to the next round. The Golden Set winner is the team that first obtains 15 points, provided that the points difference between the two teams is at least 2 points (thus, the Golden Set is similar to a tiebreak set in a normal match).

Participating teams
Drawing of lots for the 37 participating team was held in Luxembourg City, Luxembourg on 14 June 2017.
Serbian team Železničar Lajkovac qualified as 2017 BVA Cup winner.

1.Team entering at Qualification round.

Qualification round
1st leg (Team #1 home) 21–23 November 2017
2nd leg (Team #2 home) 28–30 November 2017

Main phase

16th Finals
1st leg (Team #1 home) 12–14 December 2017
2nd leg (Team #2 home) 9–11 January 2018

8th Finals
1st leg (Team #1 home) 23–25 January 2018
2nd leg (Team #2 home) 6–8 February 2018

4th Finals
1st leg (Team #1 home) 20–22 February 2018
2nd leg (Team #2 home) 27 February – 1 March 2018

Final phase

Semifinals
1st leg (Team #1 home) 14 March 2018
2nd leg (Team #2 home) 21 March 2018

Finals
1st leg (Team #1 home) 4 April 2018
2nd leg (Team #2 home) 11 April 2018

Final standing

Awards

References

External links
 2018 CEV Volleyball Challenge Cup - Women

CEV Women's Challenge Cup
CEV Women's Challenge Cup
CEV Women's Challenge Cup